Odo is a genus of spiders in the family Xenoctenidae, containing 27 species occurring in Central and South America, and Australia.

Species
, it contains 27 species:
 Odo abudi (Alayón, 2002) — Hispaniola
 Odo agilis (Simon, 1897) — St. Thomas
 Odo ariguanabo (Alayón, 1995) — Cuba
 Odo australiensis (Hickman, 1944) — Central Australia
 Odo blumenauensis (Mello-Leitão, 1927) — Brazil
 Odo bruchi (Mello-Leitão, 1938) — Argentina
 Odo cubanus (Franganillo, 1946) — Cuba
 Odo desenderi (Baert, 2009) — Ecuador (Galapagos Is.)
 Odo drescoi (Caporiacco, 1955) — Venezuela
 Odo galapagoensis (Banks, 1902) — Ecuador (Galapagos Is.)
 Odo gigliolii (Caporiacco, 1947) — Guyana
 Odo incertus (Caporiacco, 1955) — Venezuela
 Odo insularis (Banks, 1902) — Ecuador (Galapagos Is.)
 Odo keyserlingi (Kraus, 1955) — El Salvador
 Odo lenis (Keyserling, 1887) — Nicaragua
 Odo limitatus (Gertsch & Davis, 1940) — Mexico
 Odo lycosoides (Chamberlin, 1916) — Peru
 Odo maelfaiti (Baert, 2009) — Ecuador (Galapagos Is.)
 Odo obscurus (Mello-Leitão, 1936) — Brazil
 Odo patricius (Simon, 1900) — Peru, Chile
 Odo pulcher (Keyserling, 1891) — Brazil
 Odo roseus (Mello-Leitão, 1941) — Argentina
 Odo sericeus (Mello-Leitão, 1944) — Argentina
 Odo serrimanus (Mello-Leitão, 1936) — Brazil
 Odo similis (Keyserling, 1891) — Brazil
 Odo tulum (Alayón, 2003) — Mexico
 Odo vittatus (Mello-Leitão, 1936) — Brazil

References

Araneomorphae
Araneomorphae genera
Spiders of North America
Spiders of South America
Spiders of Australia
Xenoctenidae
Taxa named by Eugen von Keyserling